Södertälje Idrottsplats or simply Södertälje IP is a football stadium in Södertälje, Sweden and the home stadium for the football team Södertälje FK. Södertälje IP has a total capacity of 1,500 spectators.

References 

Football venues in Sweden
Sport in Södertälje